The following outline is provided as an overview of and topical guide to Sierra Leone:

Sierra Leone – sovereign country located in West Africa.  Sierra Leone is bordered by Guinea in the northeast, Liberia in the southeast, and the Atlantic Ocean in the southwest. Sierra Leone covers a total area of 71,740 km² (27,699 sq mi) and has a population of 5,900,000. The country has a tropical climate, with a diverse environment ranging from savannah to rainforests. Freetown is the capital, seat of government, and largest city. Other major cities in the country with a population over 100,000 are Bo, Kenema, Koidu Town and Makeni. Although English is the official language spoken at schools and government administration, Krio (language derived from English and several West African languages and is native to the Sierra Leone Krio people) is the lingua franca spoken throughout the country. The Krio language unites all the different ethnic groups, especially in their trade and interaction with each other.

General reference 

 Pronunciation: 
 Common English country name: Sierra Leone
 Official English country name:  The Republic of Sierra Leone
 Common endonym(s):  
 Official endonym(s):  
 Adjectival(s): Sierra Leonean
 Demonym(s):
 ISO country codes:  SL, SLE, 694
 ISO region codes:  See ISO 3166-2:SL
 Internet country code top-level domain:  .sl

Geography of Sierra Leone 

Geography of Sierra Leone
 Sierra Leone is: a country
 Population of Sierra Leone: 6,294,774 (July 2008 est.)
 Area of Sierra Leone:71,740 km²
land: 71,620 km²
water: 120 km²
 Atlas of Sierra Leone

Location 
 Sierra Leone is situated within the following regions:
 Northern Hemisphere and Western Hemisphere
 Africa
 West Africa
 Time zone:  Coordinated Universal Time UTC+00
 Extreme points of Sierra Leone
 High:  Mount Bintumani 
 Low:  North Atlantic Ocean 0 m
 Land boundaries:  958 km
 652 km
 306 km
 Coastline:  North Atlantic Ocean 402 km

Environment of Sierra Leone 

 Climate of Sierra Leone
 Upper Guinean Rainforest Ecoregions
 Protected areas of Sierra Leone
 Wildlife of Sierra Leone
 Fauna of Sierra Leone
 Birds of Sierra Leone
 Mammals of Sierra Leone

Natural geographic features of Sierra Leone 

 Glaciers in Sierra Leone: none 
 Rivers of Sierra Leone
 World Heritage Sites in Sierra Leone: None

Regions of Sierra Leone 

Regions of Sierra Leone

Ecoregions of Sierra Leone 

List of ecoregions in Sierra Leone

Administrative divisions of Sierra Leone 

Administrative divisions of Sierra Leone
 Provinces of Sierra Leone
 Districts of Sierra Leone

Provinces of Sierra Leone 

Provinces of Sierra Leone

Districts of Sierra Leone 

Districts of Sierra Leone

Chiefdoms of Sierra Leone 

Chiefdoms of Sierra Leone

Demography of Sierra Leone 

Demographics of Sierra Leone

Government and politics of Sierra Leone 

Politics of Sierra Leone
 Form of government: presidential representative democratic republic
 Capital of Sierra Leone: Freetown
 Elections in Sierra Leone
 Political parties in Sierra Leone

Branches of the government of Sierra Leone 

Government of Sierra Leone

Executive branch of the government of Sierra Leone 
 Head of state and Head of government: President of Sierra Leone, Ernest Bai Koroma
 Cabinet of Sierra Leone

Legislative branch of the government of Sierra Leone 

 Parliament of Sierra Leone (unicameral, also known as the House of Representatives)

Judicial branch of the government of Sierra Leone 

Court system of Sierra Leone
 Supreme Court of Sierra Leone

Foreign relations of Sierra Leone 

Foreign relations of Sierra Leone
 Diplomatic missions in Sierra Leone
 Diplomatic missions of Sierra Leone

International organization membership 
The Republic of Sierra Leone is a member of:

African, Caribbean, and Pacific Group of States (ACP)
African Development Bank Group (AfDB)
African Union (AU)
Commonwealth of Nations
Economic Community of West African States (ECOWAS)
Food and Agriculture Organization (FAO)
Group of 77 (G77)
International Atomic Energy Agency (IAEA)
International Bank for Reconstruction and Development (IBRD)
International Civil Aviation Organization (ICAO)
International Criminal Court (ICCt)
International Criminal Police Organization (Interpol)
International Development Association (IDA)
International Federation of Red Cross and Red Crescent Societies (IFRCS)
International Finance Corporation (IFC)
International Fund for Agricultural Development (IFAD)
International Labour Organization (ILO)
International Maritime Organization (IMO)
International Monetary Fund (IMF)
International Olympic Committee (IOC)
International Organization for Migration (IOM)
International Red Cross and Red Crescent Movement (ICRM)

International Telecommunication Union (ITU)
International Trade Union Confederation (ITUC)
Inter-Parliamentary Union (IPU)
Islamic Development Bank (IDB)
Multilateral Investment Guarantee Agency (MIGA)
Nonaligned Movement (NAM)
Organisation for the Prohibition of Chemical Weapons (OPCW)
Organization of Eastern Caribbean States (OECS)
United Nations (UN)
United Nations Conference on Trade and Development (UNCTAD)
United Nations Educational, Scientific, and Cultural Organization (UNESCO)
United Nations Industrial Development Organization (UNIDO)
United Nations Integrated Mission in Timor-Leste (UNMIT)
Universal Postal Union (UPU)
World Confederation of Labour (WCL)
World Customs Organization (WCO)
World Federation of Trade Unions (WFTU)
World Health Organization (WHO)
World Intellectual Property Organization (WIPO)
World Meteorological Organization (WMO)
World Tourism Organization (UNWTO)
World Trade Organization (WTO)

Law and order in Sierra Leone 

Law of Sierra Leone
 Constitution of Sierra Leone
 Human rights in Sierra Leone
 LGBT rights in Sierra Leone
 Law enforcement in Sierra Leone

Military of Sierra Leone 

Military of Sierra Leone
 Command
 Commander-in-chief:
 Forces
 Army of Sierra Leone
 Navy of Sierra Leone
 Air Force of Sierra Leone

Local government in Sierra Leone 

Local government in Sierra Leone

History of Sierra Leone

Period-coverage 
Colonial era
Dominion
1961 to 1978

Culture of Sierra Leone 

Culture of Sierra Leone
 Cuisine of Sierra Leone
 Languages of Sierra Leone
 Media in Sierra Leone
 National symbols of Sierra Leone
 Coat of arms of Sierra Leone
 Flag of Sierra Leone
 National anthem of Sierra Leone
 People of Sierra Leone
 List of people from Freetown
 Prostitution in Sierra Leone
 Public holidays in Sierra Leone
 Religion in Sierra Leone
 Christianity in Sierra Leone
 Islam in Sierra Leone
 Ahmadiyya in Sierra Leone
 Judaism in Sierra Leone
 World Heritage Sites in Sierra Leone: None

Art in Sierra Leone 
 Art in Sierra Leone
 Literature of Sierra Leone
 Music of Sierra Leone

Sports in Sierra Leone 

Sports in Sierra Leone
 Football in Sierra Leone
 Sierra Leone at the Olympics

Economy and infrastructure of Sierra Leone 

Economy of Sierra Leone
 Economic rank, by nominal GDP (2007): 158th (one hundred and fifty eighth)
 Agriculture in Sierra Leone
 Banking in Sierra Leone
 Bank of Sierra Leone
 Communications in Sierra Leone
 Internet in Sierra Leone
 Companies of Sierra Leone
Currency of Sierra Leone: Leone
ISO 4217: SLL
 Health care in Sierra Leone
 Mining in Sierra Leone
 Tourism in Sierra Leone
 Transport in Sierra Leone
 Airports in Sierra Leone
 Rail transport in Sierra Leone
 Water supply and sanitation in Sierra Leone

Education in Sierra Leone 

Education in Sierra Leone

See also 

Sierra Leone
Index of Sierra Leone–related articles
List of international rankings
List of Sierra Leone-related topics
Member state of the Commonwealth of Nations
Member state of the United Nations
Outline of Africa
Outline of geography
2014 Ebola virus epidemic in Sierra Leone

References

External links 

 Government and Diplomacy
 The Republic of Sierra Leone official government site
 Sierra Leone High Commission in London
 Diplomatic Representations of Sierra Leone
 British High Commission in Sierra Leone
 US Embassy in Sierra Leone

 Tourism and Travel
 
 Aisha's Eye on Sierra Leone a photo documentary
 National Tourist Board of Sierra Leone official site
 Visit Sierra Leone Travel and Tourism information
 US Department of State travel information

 Economy and Business
 Index of Economic Freedom - Sierra Leone is 48.4% free
 Sierra Leone Business Directory
Fadugu Sending Money to Sierra Leone
 (pdf) Doing Business in Sierra Leone - A Commercial Guide for US Companies
 World Bank Data & Statistics on Sierra Leone

 News Media and Discussion
 allAfrica.com - Sierra Leone News Aggregator
 Awareness Times Newspaper
 The New People The New People Newspaper
 IRIN Sierra Leone humanitarian news and analysis
 ENCISS civil society and governance
 Sierra Eye Sierra Leone News Portal

 Other Resources
 CIA World Factbook - Sierra Leone
 
 
 Sierra Leone Web
 Sweet Salone, 2008
 War Crimes Trials in Sierra Leone

Sierra Leone
 1